Ringa Monastery is a Buddhist monastery in Yunnan, China.

References

Buddhist monasteries in Yunnan
Tibetan Buddhist monasteries
Buildings and structures in Dêqên Tibetan Autonomous Prefecture